Ismar Volić is a Bosnian-American mathematician. He is a professor of mathematics at Wellesley College and a co-founder of the Institute for Mathematics and Democracy.

Education and career 

Volić completed his undergraduate degree at Boston University in 1998 and his Ph.D. in mathematics at Brown University in 2003 under the direction of Thomas Goodwillie. He was a Whyburn Research Instructor at the University of Virginia from 2003 to 2006. He has been teaching at Wellesley College since 2006. He was a visiting professor at MIT, Louvain-la-Neuve University, and the University of Virginia.  

In 2019, he co-founded the Institute for Mathematics and Democracy to "promote a deeper understanding of mathematics as a pivotal force in creating a democracy where people make informed political decisions and enact change based on objective and rigorous quantitative criteria".

Volić is an active member of the Bosnian-Herzegovinian American Academy of Arts and Sciences, an organization dedicated to advancement of arts and science in Bosnia and Herzegovina. He was its treasurer in 2016–2019, vice-president in 2019–20, and its president in 2020–21. He travels to Bosnia and Herzegovina frequently through his involvement in various education and research activities, including advising Ph.D. students and working with various agencies to bring quality STEM education to the country.

Research 
Volić's research is in algebraic topology. He is the author of over thirty articles and two books and has delivered more than two hundred lectures in some twenty countries. He has contributed to the fields of calculus of functors, spaces of embeddings and immersions, configuration space integrals, finite type invariants, Milnor invariants, rational homotopy theory, topological data analysis, and social choice theory.

Selected papers 
 "Formality of the little N-discs operad", with P. Lambrechts, Memoirs of the American Mathematical Society, 239 (2014), no. 1079, 116 pp.
 "The rational homology of spaces of long knots in codimension >2", with P. Lambrechts and V. Turchin, Geometry & Topology, 14 (2010), 2151–2187.
 "Calculus of functors, operad formality, and rational homology of embedding spaces", with G. Arone and P. Lambrechts, Acta Mathematica, 199 (2007), no. 2, 153-198.
 "Finite type knot invariants and calculus of functors", Compositio Mathematica, 142 (2006), 222-250.

Books 
 Cubical homotopy theory, with B. Munson, New Mathematical Monographs, 25. Cambridge University Press, Cambridge, 2015. 625 pp.

Awards 
Volić was awarded a 2017-2018 Fulbright U.S. Scholar grant, which he used to visit University of Sarajevo. He was also selected as a Fulbright Specialist for three years in 2020. He has received several grants form the National Science Foundation as well as grants from the Simons Foundation and the Open Society Foundation.

References 

Year of birth missing (living people)
Living people
Wellesley College faculty
Boston University alumni
Brown University alumni